This is a list of law enforcement agencies in the state of Virginia.

According to the US Bureau of Justice Statistics' 2008 Census of State and Local Law Enforcement Agencies, the state had 340 law enforcement agencies employing 22,848 sworn police officers, about 293 for each 100,000 residents.

State agencies 
Virginia Alcoholic Beverage Control Authority
Virginia Department of Agriculture and Consumer Services - Charitable Gaming
Virginia Department of Corrections
Virginia Department of Fire Programs - State Fire Marshal's Office
Virginia Department of Forestry
Virginia Department of Juvenile Justice
Virginia Department of Motor Vehicles Law Enforcement Division
Virginia Department of Wildlife Resources Conservation Police
General Assembly - Virginia Division of Capitol Police
Virginia Marine Resources Commission - Virginia Marine Police
Virginia Office of State Inspector General
Virginia Port Authority Police
Virginia State Corporation Commission - Bailiffs
Virginia State Lottery Security Division
Virginia State Parks Police
Virginia State Police

Special District agencies 

 Chesapeake Bay Bridge-Tunnel District and Commission Police Department

County agencies 

 Accomack County Sheriff's Office
 Albemarle County Police Department
 Albemarle County Sheriff's Office
 Allegheny County Sheriff's Office
 Amelia County Sheriff's Office 
 Amherst County Sheriff's Office
 Appomattox County Sheriff's Office
 Arlington County Police Department
 Arlington County Sheriff's Office
 Augusta County Sheriff's Office
 Bath County Sheriff's Office 
 Bedford County Sheriff's Office
 Bland County Sheriff's Office
 Botetourt County Sheriff's Office 
 Brunswick County Sheriff's Office 
 Buchanan County Sheriff's Office 
 Buckingham County Sheriff's Office
 Campbell County Sheriff's Office 
 Caroline County Sheriff's Office
 Carroll County Sheriff's Office 
 Charles City County Sheriff's Office
 Charlotte County Sheriff's Office
 Chesterfield County Police Department
 Chesterfield County Sheriff's Office
 Clarke County Sheriff's Office 
 Craig County Sheriff's Office
 Culpeper County Sheriff's Office 
 Cumberland County Sheriff's Office
 Dickenson County Sheriff's Office
 Dinwiddie County Sheriff's Office
 Essex County Sheriff's Office
 Fairfax County Police Department
 Fairfax County Sheriff's Office
 Fauquier County Sheriff's Office
 Floyd County Sheriff's Office

 Fluvanna County Sheriff's Office 
 Franklin County Sheriff's Office 
 Frederick County Sheriff's Office
 Giles County Sheriff's Office
 Gloucester County Sheriff's Office
 Goochland County Sheriff's Office 
 Grayson County Sheriff's Office
 Greene County Sheriff's Office
 Greensville County Sheriff's Office  
 Halifax County Sheriff's Office
 Hanover County Sheriff's Office
 Henrico County Police Department
 Henrico County Sheriff's Office
 Henry County Sheriff's Office
 Highland County Sheriff's Office
 Isle of Wight County Sheriff's Office
 James City County Police Department  
 King and Queen County Sheriff's Office 
 King George County Sheriff's Office 
 King William County Sheriff's Office
 Lancaster County Sheriff's Office 
 Lee County Sheriff's Office
 Loudoun County Sheriff's Office
 Louisa County Sheriff's Office 
 Lunenburg County Sheriff's Office
 Madison County Sheriff's Office 
 Mathews County Sheriff's Office 
 Mecklenburg County Sheriff's Office
 Middlesex County Sheriff's Office 
 Montgomery County Sheriff's Office 
 Nelson County Sheriff's Office 
 New Kent County Sheriff's Office 
 Northampton County Sheriff's Office 
 Northumberland County Sheriff's Office 

 Nottoway County Sheriff's Office 
 Orange County Sheriff's Office 
 Page County Sheriff's Office 
 Patrick County Sheriff's Office 
 Pittsylvania County Sheriff's Office
 Powhatan County Sheriff's Office
 Prince Edward County Sheriff's Office 
 Prince George County Police Department
 Prince George County Sheriff's Office
 Prince William County Police Department
 Prince William County Sheriff's Office
 Pulaski County Sheriff's Office 
 Rappahanock County Sheriff's Office 
 Richmond County Sheriff's Office 
 Roanoke County Police Department
 Roanoke County Sheriff's Office
 Rockbridge County Sheriff's Office
 Rockingham County Sheriff's Office
 Russell County Sheriff's Office 
 Scott County Sheriff's Office 
 Shenandoah County Sheriff's Office
 Smyth County Sheriff's Office
 Southampton County Sheriff's Office 
 Spotsylvania County Sheriff's Office
 Stafford County Sheriff's Office
 Surry County Sheriff's Office 
 Sussex County Sheriff's Office 
 Tazewell County Sheriff's Office
 Warren County Sheriff's Office 
 Washington County Sheriff's Office 
 Westmoreland County Sheriff's Office
 Williamsburg-James City County Sheriff's Office
 Wise County Sheriff's Office 
 Wythe County Sheriff's Office
 York-Poquoson Sheriff's Office

City agencies 

 Alexandria Sheriff's Office
 Alexandria Police Department
 Bristol Sheriff's Office
 Bristol Police Department
 Buena Vista Sheriff's Office
 Buena Vista Police Department
 Charlottesville Sheriff's Office
 Charlottesville Police Department
 Chesapeake Sheriff's Office 
 Chesapeake Police Department 
 Colonial Heights Sheriff's Office 
 Colonial Heights Police Department 
 Covington Division of Police 
 Danville Sheriff's Office 
 Danville Police Department
 Fairfax Sheriff's Office
 City of Fairfax Police Department
 City of Falls Church Sheriff's Office
 City of Falls Church Police Department
 Franklin Police Department
 Fredericksburg Sheriff's Office
 Fredericksburg Police Department

 Galax Police Department
 Hampton Sheriff's Office
 Hampton Police Department
 Harrisonburg Police Department
 Hopewell Sheriff's Office
 Hopewell Police Department
 Lexington Police Department
 Lynchburg Sheriff's Office
 Lynchburg Police Department
 Manassas Police Department
 Manassas Park Police Department
 Martinsville Sheriff's Office
 Martinsville Police Department
 Newport News Sheriff's Office
 Newport News Police Department
 Newport News Park Rangers
 Norfolk Sheriff's Office
 Norfolk Police Department
 Norton Sheriff's Office
 Norton Police Department
 Petersburg Sheriff's Office
 Petersburg Bureau of Police

 Poquoson Police Department
 Portsmouth Sheriff's Office 
 Portsmouth Police Department
 Radford Sheriff's Office
 Radford Police Department
 Richmond Sheriff's Office
 Richmond Police Department
 Roanoke City Sheriff's Office
 Roanoke Police Department
 Salem Sheriff's Office
 Salem Police Department
 Staunton Sheriff's Office
 Staunton Police Department
 Suffolk Sheriff's Office
 Suffolk Police Department
 Virginia Beach Police Department
 Virginia Beach, Virginia Sheriff's Office
 Waynesboro Sheriff's Office
 Waynesboro Police Department
 Williamsburg Police Department
 Winchester Sheriff's Office
 Winchester Police Department

Town agencies 

Town agencies include:

Abingdon Police Department
Alberta Police Department
Altavista Police Department
Amherst Police Department
Appalachia Police Department
Ashland Police Department
Bedford Police Department
Berryville Police Department
Big Stone Gap Police Department
Blackstone Police Department 
Bluefield Police Department 
Boones Mill Police Department
Bowling Green Police Department
Blacksburg Police Department
Boydton Police Department
Boykins Police Department
Bridgewater Police Department 
Broadway Police Department
Brodnax Police Department
Brookneal Police Department 
Burkeville Police Department 
Cape Charles Police Department
Cedar Bluff Police Department 
Chase City Police Department
Chatham Police Department
Chilhowie Police Department
Chincoteague Police Department
Christiansburg Police Department
Clarksville Police Department 
Clifton Forge Police Department
Clinchco Police Department 
Clintwood Police Department 
Coeburn Police Department
Colonial Beach Police Department
Courtland Police Department 
Craigsville Police Department 
Crewe Police Department
Culpeper Police Department
Damascus Police Department 
Dayton Police Department
Drakes Branch Police Department 
Dublin Police Department
Dumfries Police Department
Eastville Police Department 
Elkton Police Department
Emporia Police Department 
Exmore Police Department 
Farmville Police Department
Front Royal Police Department
Gate City Police Department
Glade Spring Police Department
Glasgow Police Department
Glen Lyn Police Department
Gordonsville Police Department
Gretna Police Department
Grottoes Police Department
Grundy Police Department
Halifax Police Department
Hallwood Police Department 
Haymarket Police Department
Haysi Police Department
Herndon Police Department
Hillsville Police Department
Honaker Police Department 
Hurt Police Department
Independence Police Department
Jonesville Police Department
Kenbridge Police Department 
Kilmarnock Police Department
La Crosse Police Department
Lawrenceville Police Department
Lebanon Police Department
Leesburg Police Department
Louisa Police Department
Luray Police Department
Marion Police Department
McKenney Police Department 
Middleburg Police Department
Middletown Police Department
Mount Jackson Police Department 
New Market Police Department
Newsoms Police Department
Narrows Police Department
Occoquan Police Department
Onancock Police Department 
Onley Police Department 
Orange Police Department
Parksley Police Department 
Pearisburg Police Department
Pembroke Police Department
Pennington Gap Police Department
Pocahontas Police Department 
Pound Police Department
Pulaski Police Department
Purcellville Police Department
Quantico Police Department
Remington Police Department
Rich Creek Police Department
Richlands Police Department
Rocky Mount Police Department
Rural Retreat Police Department 
Saltville Police Department
Scottsville Police Department 
Shenandoah Police Department
Smithfield Police Department
South Boston Police Department
South Hill Police Department
Stanley Police Department
St. Paul Police Department 
Stephens City Police Department
Strasburg Police Department
Tangier Island Police Department 
Tappahannock Police Department
Tazewell Police Department
Timberville Police Department
Victoria Police Department
Vienna Police Department
Vinton Police Department
Warrenton Police Department
Warsaw Police Department
Weber City Police Department
West Point Police Department
White Stone Police Department
Windsor Police Department
Wise Police Department
Woodstock Police Department
Wytheville Police Department

Airport agencies 
 Charlottesville-Albemarle Airport Police Department
 Lynchburg Regional Airport Police Department
 Metropolitan Washington Airports Authority Police Department
 Norfolk International Airport Police Department
 Peninsula Airport Commission Police Department (Newport News/Williamsburg International)
 Richmond International Airport Police Department
 Roanoke-Blacksburg Regional Airport Public Safety Department

University/college police agencies 
Blue Ridge Community College Public Safety Department
Bridgewater College Police and Safety Department
Central Virginia Community College Department of Public Safety and Police
Christopher Newport University Police Department
College of William and Mary Police Department
Eastern Virginia Medical School Police and Public Safety Department
Emory and Henry College Campus Police and Security Department
Ferrum College Police Department
George Mason University Department of Police and Public Safety
Germanna Community College Police Department
Hampden-Sydney College Department of Security and Police
Hampton University Police Department
J. Sargeant Reynolds Community College Police Department
James Madison University Department of Public Safety
Liberty University Police Department
Longwood University Police Department
Laurel Ridge Community College Campus Police and Security Department
Mountain Empire Community College Police Department
Norfolk State University Police Department
Northern Virginia Community College Police Department
Old Dominion University Police Department
Patrick & Henry Community College Police Department
Piedmont Virginia Community College Department of Public Safety and Police Department
Radford University Police Department
Regent University Police Department
 Richard Bland College of William and Mary Police Department
Thomas Nelson Community College Police Department
Southwest Virginia Community College Police Department
University of Mary Washington Police Department
University of Richmond Police Department
University of Virginia Police Department
University of Virginia's College at Wise Police Department
Virginia Commonwealth University Police Department
Virginia Highlands Community College Police Department
Virginia Military Institute Police Department
Virginia School for the Deaf and the Blind Office of Public Safety
Virginia State University Department of Police and Public Safety
Virginia Tech Police Department
Virginia Union University Police Department
Virginia Western Community College Police Department
Wilson Workforce and Rehabilitation Center Police Department
Wytheville Community College Police Department

Private police departments 
Aquia Harbour Police Department  
Bridgewater Airpark Police Department
Babcock & Wilcox Police Department
Carilion Clinic Police and Security Services Department  
Kings Dominion Park Police Department
Kingsmill Police Department 
Lake Monticello Police Department 
Wintergreen Police Department 
Per Virginia Code 9.1-101, which provides that any DCJS recognized Private Police Departments in existence as of January 1, 2013, shall remain authorized Virginia Private Police Departments. In section 3 of the code it lists as follows: 
 
"3. That, for the purposes of this act, the following private police departments were in existence on January 1, 2013, and were recognized as private police departments by the Department of Criminal Justice Services at that time:  Aquia Harbor Police Department, the Babcock and Wilcox Police Department, the Bridgewater Airpark Police Department, the Carilion Police and Security Services Department, the Kings Dominion Park Police Department, the Kingsmill Police Department, the Lake Monticello Police Department, the Massanutten Police Department, and the Wintergreen Police Department."

Federal Law Enforcement
 Department of Defense Police
 Defense Logistics Agency Police (Fort Belvoir and Richmond)
 Federal Bureau of Investigation
Federal Bureau of Investigation Police Department (Quantico)
Federal Protective Service
 Fort A.P. Hill
 Fort Belvoir
 Fort Eustis
 Fort Lee
 Fort Meade
 Fort Myer
 Fort Pickett
 Internal Revenue Service - Criminal Investigation
 Joint Expeditionary Base Little Creek
 Langley Air Force Base
 Mount Weather (FEMA) Police
 NASA Langley Research Center
 Naval Air Station Oceana
 Naval Amphibious Base Little Creek
 Naval Station Norfolk
 Naval Surface Warfare Center Dahlgren
 Naval Weapons Station Yorktown
 Norfolk Naval Shipyard
 Office of the United States Marshal for the Eastern District of Virginia
 Office of the United States Marshal for the Western District of Virginia
 Surface Combat Systems Center Wallops Island
 US Customs and Border Protection
 US Department of Veterans Affairs Police Richmond, Hampton and Salem Virginia
 United States Drug Enforcement Administration
 United States Park Police
 National Park Service (Law Enforcement-Ranger)
 United States Pentagon Police
 U.S. Probation and Pretrial Services System
 United States Secret Service

Railroad Police 
 Amtrak Police Department
 CSX Railroad Police Department
 Metro Transit Police Department
 Norfolk Southern Railroad Police Department

Defunct law enforcement agencies 
 Appomattox Police Department
 Bassett Police Department
 Buchanan Police Department
 Castlewood Police Department
 Central State Hospital Public Safety - Police & Fire - Converted to Security in 2015 by order of DCJS and DBHDS
 Clover Police Department
 Dorchester Police Department
 DuPont Police Department
 Eastern State Hospital Police - Converted to Security in 2015 by order of DCJS and DBHDS
 Edinburg Police Department - Absorbed by Shenandoah County Sheriff's Office 7/2015
 Floyd Police Department
 Iron Gate Police Department
 Irvington Police Department
 Massanutten Police Department - Disbanded in 2020 
 Montross Police Department
 New Castle Police Department
 Norfolk County Police Department
 Norfolk County Sheriff's Office
 Osaka Police Department
 Portsmouth Marine Terminal Police - Merged into the VPAP in the 1970s
 Princess Anne County Police Department
 Richmond Redevelopment and Housing Authority Police Department
 Saint Paul's College Police
 South Norfolk Police Department
 Southwestern Virginia Mental Health Institute Police - Converted to Security in 2015 by order of DCJS and DBHDS
 Stonega Police Department
 Toms Creek Police Department
 Urbanna Police Department
 Virginia Defense Force Military Police Company - Dissolved in major force-wide reorganization in fall 2013
 Virginia Department of Prohibition Enforcement - Absorbed by Virginia Department of Alcoholic Beverage Control
 Wakefield Police Department
 Waverly Police Department - Police Services Agreement with Sussex County Sheriff's Office effective May 1, 2021

References

Virginia
Law enforcement agencies of Virginia
Law enforcement agencies